Enric Saborit Teixidor (born 27 April 1992) is a Spanish professional footballer who plays for Israeli club Maccabi Tel Aviv as a left-back.

Club career

Athletic Bilbao
Born in Barcelona, Catalonia and raised in Mataró, at the age of 16 Saborit left the youth ranks of local RCD Espanyol and moved to Vitoria-Gasteiz where his mother was living. A short time later he joined Athletic Bilbao, prompting debate over whether his signing met the criteria of the club's policy as he had no link to the Basque region other than the short period of residency in the territory.

After graduating from Athletic's youth academy at Lezama, Saborit spent three full seasons with the reserves in the Segunda División B. He played 36 games in 2012–13, playoffs included.

Saborit made his La Liga debut with the Lions on 25 August 2013, playing the full 90 minutes in a 2–0 win against CA Osasuna at the Anoeta Stadium. On 9 July 2014, having been sparingly used in his debut campaign, he was loaned to RCD Mallorca of Segunda División.

Saborit returned to Bilbao Athletic in 2015–16, and featured regularly in their attempt to stay in the second tier, which ultimately proved unsuccessful. He made one appearance for the first team against AZ Alkmaar, in the group stage of the UEFA Europa League, starting and assisting with his head to Kike Sola's goal to mark his European debut.

Saborit was promoted once more to Athletic's main squad for the 2016–17 season, as understudy to Mikel Balenziaga. He scored his first senior goal on 8 December 2016, in a 1–1 draw at SK Rapid Wien in the Europa League group phase.

Maccabi Tel Aviv
At the end of the 2017–18 campaign, in which he featured in 23 matches in all competitions, Saborit was released by Athletic Bilbao. On 26 June 2018, he signed for Israeli Premier League club Maccabi Tel Aviv F.C. on a three-year contract.

Honours
Maccabi Tel Aviv
Israeli Premier League: 2018–19, 2019–20
Israel State Cup: 2020–21
Toto Cup: 2018–19, 2020–21
Israel Super Cup: 2019, 2020

References

External links

1992 births
Living people
Spanish footballers
Footballers from Barcelona
Association football defenders
La Liga players
Segunda División players
Segunda División B players
Tercera División players
CD Basconia footballers
Bilbao Athletic footballers
Athletic Bilbao footballers
RCD Mallorca players
Israeli Premier League players
Maccabi Tel Aviv F.C. players
Spain youth international footballers
Spanish expatriate footballers
Expatriate footballers in Israel
Spanish expatriate sportspeople in Israel